Who Stole the Doggies? is a 1915 American silent comedy film featuring Oliver Hardy.

Cast
 Frances Ne Moyer as Maggie, the Cook
 Oliver Hardy as Murphy, the Cop
 Harry Lorraine as Hogan, the Police Chief

See also
 List of American films of 1915
 Oliver Hardy filmography

External links

1915 films
1915 short films
American silent short films
American black-and-white films
1915 comedy films
Films directed by Arthur Hotaling
Silent American comedy films
American comedy short films
1910s American films